Sam Groth was the defending champion but lost in the first round to Yuya Kibi.

Daniel Evans won the title after defeating Konstantin Kravchuk 3–6, 6–4, 6–4 in the final.

Seeds

Draw

Finals

Top half

Bottom half

References

External links
Main draw
Qualifying draw

Santaizi ATP Challenger - Singles
Santaizi ATP Challenger